Flying Home is a 2014 romantic drama film directed by Dominique Deruddere.

Plot
A sheikh from Dubai wants to buy the Flemish homing pigeon Wittekop, which is owned by Jos Pauwels, and uses an American middleman named Colin to make the deal. Although Jos is not interested in selling the pigeon, his granddaughter Isabelle is clearly interested in Colin.

Cast
 Jan Decleir as Jos Pauwels
  as Isabelle Pauwels
 Jamie Dornan as Colin Montgomery
 Anthony Head as Mr. Montgomery
 Sharon Maughan as Mrs. Montgomery
 Josse De Pauw as Priest
 Viviane De Muynck as Martha
 Eline Van der Velden as Celia
 Piet Fuchs as Mr. Conrad
 Max Pirkis as Jason
 Mitchell Mullen as Walden
 Ali Suliman as the Sheikh
 Omar bin Haider as the Sheikh's right-hand man
 Numan Acar as Karadeniz

External links
 
 

2014 romantic drama films
2014 films
Belgian romantic drama films
2010s Dutch-language films
2010s English-language films
Films shot in Belgium
German romantic drama films
2014 multilingual films
Belgian multilingual films
German multilingual films
2010s German films
Dutch-language Belgian films
English-language Belgian films
English-language German films